Ross Greer (born 23 September 1967) is a retired Australian footballer. He played for Floreat Athena, Chester City, South China, Selangor, Eastern, Instant-Dict, Sorrento, Melbourne Knights and Leeming Strikers before retiring.

Greer's spell playing in The Football League in England in late 1989 with Chester was short-lived. In four first–team games (two in cup football) he failed to find the net for Chester and scored an own–goal in a 2–0 defeat to Shrewsbury Town. He was not awarded a long–term contract.

In 1995, Greer was capped three times for the Hong Kong national football team. He also played briefly for the Hong Kong national cricket team, representing Hong Kong in matches against Singapore and Thailand at the 1993 Tuanku Ja'afar Cup. He had earlier played that sport at under-19 level for Western Australia.

External links
Ross Greer Oz Football

References

1967 births
Living people
Australian soccer players
Australian expatriate soccer players
Hong Kong First Division League players
Hong Kong international footballers
Association football midfielders
English Football League players
National Soccer League (Australia) players
Eastern Sports Club footballers
South China AA players
Double Flower FA players
Chester City F.C. players
Melbourne Knights FC players
Selangor FA players
Expatriate footballers in Hong Kong
Expatriate footballers in Malaysia
Floreat Athena FC players
Australian expatriate sportspeople in Hong Kong
Cricketers from Western Australia
Soccer players from Perth, Western Australia